WAPDA Football Club was a football club of Water & Power Development Authority, based in Lahore, Punjab, Pakistan, that competed in Pakistan Premier League. They last participated in 2018 National Challenge Cup, where lost to Pakistan Air Force in the finals.

WAPDA has been Pakistan champions 8 times, winning four titles in Pakistan Premier League. They won their first league title in 1983 beating Habib Bank, and repeated this feat in 1991 against Habib Bank. In 2001, they overcame Khan Research Laboratories to win their third title, and retained their title in 2003 against Pakistan Army. In 2004 in the revamped Pakistan Premier League, they became the inaugural champions, when they pushed Pakistan Army into second in a final day decider.

Their biggest achievement came in 2007–08 season when they finished the season unbeaten after defeating Pakistan Army on the final day. They are the only Pakistani club to finish the season unbeaten and earning the title of Invincibles.

Since the start of Pakistan Premier League, WAPDA have become one of the three dominant clubs in Pakistan along with Pakistan Army and Khan Research Laboratories.

Asian competitions
WAPDA's first ever Asian competition appearance was in 1991 Asian Club Championship, where they lost 5–0 to Dhaka Mohammedan SC away, and drew 0–0 at home, thus losing 5–0 on aggregate.
They represented Pakistan in the AFC President's Cup 2005, losing both of their games against Blue Star SC and Hello United and defeated Dordoi Bishkek 1–0 in their last group stage match as they were knocked-out of out the group stages. The club's next appearance in Asian competition was in 2008 AFC President's Cup, where once again they finished at bottom of their group, drawing one and losing two matches. In 2009 AFC President's Cup, WAPDA finished second in their group and qualified for semi-finals after being the best second-placed in the tournament, WAPDA faced their group-mate Regar-TadAZ in the semi-finals, WAPDA lost 4–3 at extra-time. Club's last Asian appearance was in 2011 AFC President's Cup, where they finished third in their group and were knocked out.

Performance in AFC competitions
 Asian Club Championship: 1 appearance
1992: Qualifying - 1st round

AFC President's Cup: 4 appearances
2005: 3° in Group Stage
2008: 4° in Group Stage
2009: Semi-finalist
2011: 3° in Group Stage

AFC President's Cup matches

Current squad

Honors
WAPDA are one of the most successful club in Pakistan, in terms of trophies won. The club's first trophy was National Football League in 1983. The club won most trophies in 2000s, winning the league five times. Their biggest achievement in continental competition was reaching the semi-finals of AFC President's Cup 2009, where they lost to Tajik side Regar-TadAZ 4–3 on extra time.

Leagues
 National Football League/Pakistan Premier League
 Winners (8): 1983–84, 1990–91, 2000–01, 2002–2003, 2004-05, 2007-08, 2008-09, 2010-11
 National Football Challenge Cup
 2020

 Quaid-i-Azam Shield:
 Winners (1): 1992

Officials

References

External links
WAPDA website

Football clubs in Pakistan
1983 establishments in Pakistan
F.C
Football in Lahore
Association football clubs established in 1983